Scopula spissitarsata is a moth of the  family Geometridae. It is found in western Sumatra.

References

Moths described in 1899
spissitarsata
Moths of Indonesia